John "Joe" Peacock (15 March 1897 – 4 March 1979) was an English international footballer, who played as a wing half.

Career
Born in Wigan, Peacock played professionally for Middlesbrough,  and earned three caps for England in 1929.

References

1897 births
1979 deaths
English footballers
England international footballers
Middlesbrough F.C. players
English Football League players
Association football midfielders